Kwan Shan (April 20, 1933 – October 1, 2012) was a Hong Kong film actor. Kwan appeared as a romantic lead actor in Mandarin-language films created in Hong Kong, especially during the 1960s. His roles included several Shaw Brothers Studio productions.

Early life 
Kwan was born on April 20, 1933 in Shenyang, Liaoning province, China, and later moved to Hong Kong. He was an ethnic Manchu who traced his heritage to the Guwalgiya clan.

Personal life 
Kwan's daughter is Rosamund Kwan, an actress.

Kwan died of lung cancer on October 1, 2012, at the age of 79. His funeral was held at the Hong Kong Funeral Home.

Filmography

Films 
This is a partial list of films.
1958 You nu huai chun - Ping Kelai
1958 Ah Q zheng zhuan - Ah Q
1959 Teenager's holiday - Hsu Ke-Ming
1960 Yu guang lian - Sheng
1961 Love without end - Tang Pengnan
1962 Zi mei qing chou
1962 Hong lou meng - Jia Lian
1962 Xi shi zhong zhong - Chou Da-ye
1963 The Love Eterne
1963 Yang Nai Wu yu Xiao Bai Cai - Yang Nai-wu
1963: Yi mao qian
1963: Di er chun - Lin Yung-Kang
1964: Between Tears and Smiles
1964: Shan ge lian - Liu Ta-lung
1965: Hong ling lei
1966: the blue and the black - Zhang Xingya
1966: Mei gui wo ai ni
1966: Kuai lo qing chun
1967 Feng huo wan li qing
1967 Xing yue zheng hui
1967 Xie hen jing - Hu A-Mao
1967 Chui si tian e - Tu Fan
1967 Susanna - Lin Cheng Ting
1967 Chu gu huang yin - Li Meng-chuang
1969 Bi hai qing tian ye ye xin - Hu Zhong Ning
1969 Tao li chun feng - Tu Ching-Kang
1969 Chun can - Liu Shimin
1969: Wo hen yue chang yuan
1970: A Cause to Kill - Li De Chang
1970: Zhongqing yi hao
1970: Yi feng qing bao bai wan bing
1970: Ku qing hua
1970: Chi xin de ren
1970: You nan huai chun
1970: Duo ming yan luo
1971: Wu dui jia ou
1971: Shuang qiang Wang Ba Mei
1971: Long shang chun hen
1971: Dao bu liu ren
1971: Jia hua zong bi ye hua xiang
1971: Nu shan jing hun
1972: Kuang feng sha
1972: Se zi tou shang yi ba dao
1972: Pei shi
1972: Tang ran ke
1973 Ai yu qi tan
1973 Nu huo
1973 Bu su zhi ke
1974 Yun piao piao
1974 'Hai Yan
1974 Guang dao nian ba - Imai Eisaku
1974 Bie liao qin ren
1974 Zhong tai quan tan sheng si zhan
1975 Lao nu ri ji
1975 Ling mo
1975 Qu mo nu
1975 Lang wen
1975 Qing suo
1975 Shi san bu da
1975 Xiao Shandong dao Xianggang
1976 Long jia jiang
1976 Mi zong sheng shou - Mr. Tseng
1976 Qiu Xia - Li Po-hao
1976 Yeongno
1977 Si da men pai
1977 Gui ma gu ye zi
1977 Broken Oath -  Liu Da Xiong, General Liu.
1977 Pian pian feng ye pian pian qing
1978 Diao nu - Abbott
1978 Hua fei hua
1978 Zhui gan pao tiao peng
1980 Guningtou da zhan
1980 Yuan
1980 Da di yong shi
1980 Mei li yu ai chou
1981: Chuan qi ren wu
1981: Huang tian hou tu - Fang Yi-Pao
1981: Zhi ye xiong shou1982: Ma liu guo hai1982: Xiao dao hui1982: Shou xin1983: Yi chu jing hun1983: Feng shui er shi nian - Manager Chung
1986: Foo gwai lip che - Bandit
1986: Dream Lovers - Hark-Nam
1987: Duet ming ga yan - Director Cheung
1987: A Better Tomorrow II - Ko Ying Pui
1988: Police Story 2 - President Fung 
1991: Gui gan bu - Sub-chief Lu / Li Fu-Min
1993: Yin doi hou hap zyun - The President
1994: 7 jin gong'' - Chief (final film role)

References

External links

 Guan Shan at hkmdb.com

1933 births
2012 deaths
Hong Kong male film actors
Hong Kong people of Manchu descent
Manchu male actors
Deaths from lung cancer
Male actors from Shenyang
Male actors from Liaoning
Chinese male film actors
Shaw Brothers Studio